Cleveland Post was a weekly newspaper based in Fuquay-Varina, North Carolina covering northwestern Johnston County, North Carolina and the Cleveland community.  It closed in 2013.

References

Defunct newspapers published in North Carolina
Mass media in Wake County, North Carolina